Al-Bida al-Gharbiyah (البیدع الغربیه) is a settlement in Qatar, located in the municipality of Ad Dawhah.

References

Communities in Doha